The General Inspectorate of Security Forces (GIBS) (Czech: Generální inspekce bezpečnostních sborů) is a Czech independent government agency tasked with investigating crimes of the officers of the Police of the Czech Republic, Customs protection, Prison Service, inspection workers or civil employees of these institutions.

History 
In 2010, the Věci veřejné political party demanded the resignation of then police president Oldřich Martinů. Former VV's Minister of the Interior Radek John also called for a new police president. The argument was settled after then President of the Czech Republic Václav Klaus formulated an agreement between the Police of the Czech Republic, the ODS and the VV. It was stipulated that the VV would choose a new police president while the ODS would appoint the director of the newly formed GIBS.

References 

Law enforcement in the Czech Republic
2011 establishments in the Czech Republic